is a Japanese actress who is affiliated with both Toei Management and Mumeijuku. She starred in the 43rd NHK Asadora Wakko no Kin Medaru (1989–1990), which earned an average rating of 33.8%.

Filmography

TV series

Films

References

External links
 Official profile at Mumeijuku 
 Official profile at Toei Management 

Japanese actresses
1969 births
Living people
People from Fujinomiya, Shizuoka
Actors from Shizuoka Prefecture
Asadora lead actors